Early Steppenwolf is a collection of live recordings by Steppenwolf when they were still known as "The Sparrow" [nee: "The Sparrows"]. It was released in July 1969 on the ABC Dunhill Records label.

Prior to the formation of the Steppenwolf partnership in 1968, music producer arranger, Gabriel Mekler changed the name of the band based on a book he was reading at the time by Hermann Hesse.  Nick St. Nicholas was one of the driving forces in music of the hippie counterculture movement, the Summer of Love, having booked the band at the Matrix club in the San Francisco Bay Area. On May 14, 1967, the manager of the Matrix club recorded two shows, including a 20-minute version of The Pusher. These are the live recordings released by ABC Dunhill Records as Early Steppenwolf .

Track listing
Side one
"Power Play" (John Kay) – 2:55
"Howlin' for My Darlin'" (Dixon, Howlin' Wolf) – 4:53
"I'm Going Upstairs" (Hooker) – 7:14
"Corina, Corina" (Arranged and adapted by Kay) – 3:54
"Tighten up Your Wig" (Kay) – 3:14
Side two
"The Pusher" (Hoyt Axton) – 21:27

Personnel

Musicians
 John Kay – guitar, vocals, liner notes
 Mars Bonfire – guitar
 Goldy McJohn – piano, organ
 Nick St. Nicholas –bass, backing vocals
 Jerry Edmonton – drums

Technical
 Peter Abram – producer
 David Travis – engineer
 Gary Burden – art direction, design

References

1969 live albums
Steppenwolf (band) live albums
MCA Records live albums